Luis Gutiérrez Martín (26 November 1931 – 22 June 2016) was a Roman Catholic bishop.

Ordained to the priesthood in 1957, Gutiérrez Martín was appointed auxiliary bishop in 1988 of the Roman Catholic Archdiocese of Madrid, Spain. He then served as bishop of the Roman Catholic Diocese of Segovia from 1995 to 2007.

Notes

1931 births
2016 deaths
21st-century Roman Catholic bishops in Spain